"Higher Power" is a song by Swedish singer Anna Bergendahl, released as a single on 26 February 2022. It was performed in Melodifestivalen 2022 and made it to the final on 12 March 2022. In the final, it came in 12th place.

Melodifestivalen 
Bergendahl performed Higher Power in Heat 4 on 26 February 2022. It received 73 points and made it to the semi-finals on 5 March. In semi-final 1 it was in the top 2 and qualified to the final on 12 March. In the final, the song received 11 points from the international juries and 18 points from the televote which made it come in 12th place.

Charts

References

2022 songs
2022 singles
Melodifestivalen songs of 2022
Songs written by Thomas G:son
Songs written by Erik Bernholm
Songs written by Bobby Ljunggren